The Renault Rodeo was a series of off-road mini SUVs produced between 1970 and 1987 by ACL for Renault. In total there were three generations of the Rodeo.
At first the car was called the ACL Rodeo and the name was changed to Renault Rodeo in July 1976. The vehicle was front wheel drive but could be ordered also with four wheel drive technic supplied by Sinpar.

Rodeo 4 (1970-1981)

The original Rodeo 4 was based on the platform of the Renault 4 van, with an 845 cc engine.

Rodeo 6 (1972-1981)
In 1972, a second model appeared, now known as the Rodeo 6. It was still based on the platform of the R4 van, but with the 1108 cc engine of the Renault 6. In 1979, the Rodeo 6 was improved and adopted the 1289 cc engine of the Renault 5. The Rodeo 4 and the Rodeo 6 coexisted from 1972 to 1981.

Rodeo (1981-1987)
A new model with a smaller and entirely new body replaced the Rodeos 4 and 6 in 1981, simply called the Rodeo. A limited series of all wheel drive versions were built in 1984 only, called the Rodeo Hoggar.

The "Trafic" Rodeo
The Rodeo name was also used by Renault in Argentina to designate a local variant of the Renault Trafic (1st. generation), which had a flat rear chassis and a flatbed with dropping sides and rear (similar to a pick-up). The flatbed was designed to be removable, allowing Rodeo buyers to use it as a rolling chassis for mounting specific rear compartments.

Rodeo
Off-road vehicles
Mini sport utility vehicles
Convertibles